Terry Chen (born February 3, 1975) is a Canadian film and television actor.

Early life
Chen was born in Edmonton, Alberta, to Taiwanese and Chinese parents originating from Taiwan (father) and mainland China (mother). After primary and secondary education in Edmonton and Vancouver, British Columbia, he briefly studied at the University of Calgary before later moving to Vancouver to pursue acting.

Career
Chen's breakout role was as real-life Rolling Stone editor Ben Fong-Torres in the 2000 Cameron Crowe film Almost Famous.  He has appeared in several television shows, including Steven Spielberg's TV miniseries Taken, and was a series regular on Combat Hospital.  Chen has appeared in feature films I, Robot, The Chronicles of Riddick, Snakes on a Plane and had a leading role in the horror/thriller They Wait.

Chen played a recurring role in the Canadian science fiction series Continuum, which premiered on Showcase on May 27, 2012. Chen portrayed Xander Feng in Season 2 of Netflix's House of Cards. From 2017 to 2018 he played botanist Praxideke Meng in The Expanse seasons 2 and 3, and in 2018 appeared in season 2 of Jessica Jones as Pryce Cheng.

In the film Falling, Chen plays the understanding husband of a man (played by actor/director Viggo Mortensen) trying to care for his homophobic, misogynist and increasingly demented father.

Filmography

Film

Television

Video games

References

External links
 
 

1975 births
Living people
Canadian male film actors
Canadian male actors of Chinese descent
Canadian male actors of Taiwanese descent
Male actors from Edmonton
20th-century Canadian male actors
21st-century Canadian male actors
Canadian male television actors
Canadian male voice actors